Coming of Age is the debut album by American rapper Memphis Bleek. It was released by Get Low Records, Roc-A-Fella, and Def Jam on August 3, 1999. The album spawned the hit single "Memphis Bleek Is...". The album was certified Gold by the RIAA on September 14, 1999 for shipment of over 500,000 units.

Critical reception

Matt Diehl of Entertainment Weekly praised Bleek for holding his own lyrically alongside guest artists Ja Rule and N.O.R.E., and displaying striking sensitivity on "Regular Cat". He also noted how the album's production of "ominous inner-city symphonies and raw street beats" was ageless. Keith Farley from AllMusic noted how Bleek's vocal delivery was more "street-level" than Jay-Z's, along with the album containing an "urban funk" style like most of his material, concluding that "Still, Coming of Age is a fine debut that shows Memphis Bleek already leaps and bounds ahead of most rappers." In a dual review with Ja's Venni Vetti Vecci, Rolling Stones Rob Sheffield felt that Bleek came across as a cliché-filled rapper that lacked witticism in his lyrics and wasted the beats given to him by his producers.

Track listing

Samples

Regular Cat
"Love and Let Love" by Roberta Flack
Stay Alive in NYC
"Summer Is the Coldest Time of Year" by Patti Austin
What You Think of That
"High Velocity" by Keith Mansfield
Who's Sleeping
"If This World Were Mine" by Zulema

Personnel 

Juan Allen – Engineer
B-High – Executive Producer
Big Jaz – Producer, Executive Producer
Buckwild – Producer
Kareem "Biggs" Burke – Executive Producer
Eric "Ebo" Butler – Mixing
Eric Butler – Mixing
Shawn Carter – Executive Producer
Tim Coyne – Mastering
Tom Coyne – Mastering
Da Ranjahz – Performer
Dark Half – Producer
Damon Dash – Executive Producer
Irv Gotti – Producer, Mixing
J-Runnah – Producer
Ja Rule – Performer
Jay-Z – Performer
Robert "Shim" Kirkland – Producer
Lil Rob – Producer
Jonathan Mannion – Photography
Mr. Fingers – Producer
Monica Morrow – Stylist
Noreaga – Performer
Bernard "Big Demi" Parker – Producer
Joe Quinde – Engineer, Mixing
Beanie Sigel – Performer
Chico Spades – Engineer
Swizz Beatz – Producer
Tai – Multi Instruments, Producer
Darold Trotter – Producer
Patrick Viala – Producer, Engineer, Mixing
Carlisle Young – Engineer

Charts

Weekly charts

Year-end charts

Certifications

See also
 List of number-one R&B albums of 1999 (U.S.)

References

1999 debut albums
Def Jam Recordings albums
Memphis Bleek albums
Albums produced by Irv Gotti
Albums produced by Swizz Beatz
Roc-A-Fella Records albums